Willie Prophet is an American former Negro league outfielder who played in the 1930s.

Prophet played for the Bacharach Giants in 1934. In four recorded games, he posted five hits in 14 plate appearances.

References

External links
 and Seamheads

Year of birth missing
Place of birth missing
Bacharach Giants players
Baseball outfielders